Patrick Cussen Cash (5 September 1928 – 28 January 2008) was an Australian rules footballer from Victoria, who played with Hawthorn in the Victorian Football League (VFL).

Cash, a University Blacks recruit, was one of the main forward targets of a weak Hawthorn side in the 1950s. He kicked 26 goals in his debut season, which was enough to top Hawthorn's goal-kicking and included a five-goal haul in a win over Melbourne.

His son, of the same name, is a retired tennis player who won Wimbledon in 1987.

References

External links

1928 births
2008 deaths
Australian rules footballers from Victoria (Australia)
Hawthorn Football Club players
University Blacks Football Club players